The Zhenhai brown frog (Rana zhenhaiensis) is a species of frog in the family Ranidae endemic to China. Its natural habitats are subtropical or tropical moist lowland forests, montane forests, dry lowland grasslands, intermittent freshwater marshes, ponds, and irrigated land. It is not considered threatened by the IUCN.

References

Rana (genus)
Amphibians described in 1995
Amphibians of China
Endemic fauna of China
Taxonomy articles created by Polbot